Boardman v Phipps [1966] UKHL 2 is a landmark English trusts law case concerning the duty of loyalty and the duty to avoid conflicts of interest.

Facts
Mr Tom Boardman was the solicitor of a family trust. The trust assets include a 27% holding in a company (a textile company with factories in Coventry, Nuneaton and in Australia through a subsidiary). Boardman was concerned about the accounts of the company, and thought that to protect the trust a majority shareholding is required. He and a beneficiary, Tom Phipps, went to a shareholders' general meeting of the company. They realised together that they could turn the company around. They suggested to a trustee (Mr Fox) that it would be desirable to acquire a majority shareholding, but Fox said it was completely out of the question for the trustees to do so. With the knowledge of the trustees, Boardman and Phipps decided to purchase the shares themselves. They bought a majority stake. But they did not obtain the fully informed consent of all the beneficiaries. By capitalizing some of the assets, the company made a distribution of capital without reducing the values of the shares. The trust benefited by this distribution £47,000, while Boardman and Phipps made £75,000. But then John Phipps, another beneficiary, sued for their profits, alleging a conflict of interest.

Judgment

High Court
Wilberforce J held that Boardman was liable to pay for his breach of the duty of loyalty by not accounting to the company for that amount of money, but that he could be paid for his services.

Court of Appeal
Lord Denning MR, Russell LJ and Pearson LJ upheld Wilberforce J's decision and held that Boardman and Phipps had breached his duty of loyalty, which arose as they had become self-appointed agents representing the trust, by putting themselves in a conflict of interest. They were therefore liable for the profits earned. However, they would be able to retain a generous remuneration for the services he performed. On this, Lord Denning MR said (at 1021)

House of Lords
The majority of the House of Lords (Lords Cohen, Guest and Hodson) held that there was a possibility of a conflict of interest, because the solicitor and beneficiary might have come to Boardman for advice as to the purchases of the shares. They owed fiduciary duties (to avoid any possibility of a conflict of interest) because they were negotiating over use of the trust's shares. The majority disagreed about the nature and relevance of information used by Boardman and Phipps. Lord Cohen said the information is not truly property and it does not necessarily follow that, because an agent acquired information and opportunity while acting in a fiduciary capacity, he is accountable. His liability to account depends on the facts. His Lordship regarded Boardman to be liable because he acquired the information in the course of the fiduciary relationship and because of the fiduciary relationship. The other two members of the majority, Lord Hodson and Lord Guest, opined that information can constitute property in appropriate circumstances and in the current case, the confidential information acquired can be properly regarded as property of the trust. Therefore, Boardman was speculating with trust property and should be liable. The majority agreed unanimously that liability to account for the profits made by virtue of a fiduciary relationship is strict and does not depend on fraud or absence of bona fides, and so Phipps and Boardman would have to account for their profits. However, they were generously remunerated for their services to the trust.

Lord Upjohn dissented, and held that Phipps and Boardman should not be liable because a reasonable man would not have thought there was any real sensible possibility of a conflict of interest. This is because there is no possibility the trustee would seek Boardman's advice to purchase the shares and at any rate Boardman could have declined to act if given such request.

His Lordship distinguished Regal (Hastings) v Gulliver by restricting Regal Hastings to circumstances concerned with property of which the principals were contemplating a purchase. In the present case, as the purchase of the shares was entirely out of the question, Regal Hastings was said to be inapplicable.

Lord Upjohn also agreed with Lord Cohen that information is not property at all, although equity will restrain its transmission if it has been acquired by a breach of confidence. He said unequivocally that knowledge learnt  by a trustee in the course of his duties is not property of the trust and may be used for his own benefit unless it is confidential information which is given to him (i) in circumstances which, regardless of his position as a trustee, would make it a breach of confidence to communicate it to anyone or (ii) in a fiduciary capacity.

See also

English trusts law
Corporate law
Business judgment rule

UK case law
Keech v Sandford (1724) 2 Sel Cas Ch 16
Whelpdale v Cookson  (1747) 1 Ves Sen 9
Regal (Hastings) Ltd v Gulliver [1967] 2 AC 134n 
Industrial Development Consultants v Cooley [1972] 1 WLR 443
Bhullar v Bhullar [2003] 2 BCLC 241

Notes

English trusts case law
Lord Denning cases
Lord Wilberforce cases
1966 in British law
House of Lords cases
1966 in case law